Allen Lapham Lindow (July 9, 1919 – January 18, 1989) was a halfback in the National Football League. He was a member of the Chicago Cardinals during the 1945 NFL season.

References

1919 births
1989 deaths
American football halfbacks
Chicago Cardinals players
Washington University Bears football players
Players of American football from Milwaukee